Klaus Konieczka (born 9 February 1944) is a retired West German football midfielder.

His 30 Bundesliga appearances and 1 goal came in the 1965–66 SC Tasmania 1900 Berlin season, known as the worst season of any team in the Bundesliga.

References

1944 births
Living people
German footballers
SC Tasmania 1900 Berlin players
SV Eintracht Trier 05 players
Tennis Borussia Berlin players
Association football midfielders
Bundesliga players